In probability theory and statistics, the normal-inverse-Wishart distribution (or Gaussian-inverse-Wishart distribution) is a multivariate four-parameter family of continuous probability distributions. It is the conjugate prior of a multivariate normal distribution with unknown mean and covariance matrix (the inverse of the precision matrix).

Definition
Suppose

has a multivariate normal distribution with mean  and covariance matrix , where

has an inverse Wishart distribution. Then 
has a normal-inverse-Wishart distribution, denoted as

Characterization

Probability density function

 

The full version of the PDF is as follows:

Properties

Scaling

Marginal distributions

Posterior distribution of the parameters 
Suppose the sampling density is a multivariate normal distribution

With the mean and covariance matrix of the sampling distribution is unknown, we can place a Normal-Inverse-Wishart prior on the mean and covariance parameters jointly

The resulting posterior distribution for the mean and covariance matrix will also be a Normal-Inverse-Wishart 

where

.

Generating normal-inverse-Wishart random variates 
Generation of random variates is straightforward:
 Sample  from an inverse Wishart distribution with parameters  and 
 Sample  from a multivariate normal distribution with mean  and variance

Related distributions 
 The normal-Wishart distribution is essentially the same distribution parameterized by precision rather than variance.  If  then  .
 The normal-inverse-gamma distribution is the one-dimensional equivalent.
 The multivariate normal distribution and inverse Wishart distribution are the component distributions out of which this distribution is made.

Notes

References 
 Bishop, Christopher M. (2006). Pattern Recognition and Machine Learning. Springer Science+Business Media.
 Murphy, Kevin P. (2007). "Conjugate Bayesian analysis of the Gaussian distribution." 

Multivariate continuous distributions
Conjugate prior distributions
Normal distribution